Year 1114 (MCXIV) was a common year starting on Thursday (link will display the full calendar) of the Julian calendar.

Events 
 By place 

 Europe 
 January 7 – Emperor Henry V marries Matilda (or Maude), 11-year-old daughter of King Henry I of England, at Worms (modern Germany). A political conflict breaks out across the Holy Roman Empire after the marriage, triggered when Henry arrests Chancellor Adalbert and various other German princes.
 Count Ramon Berenguer III (the Great) of Barcelona, joins the expedition to the Balearic Islands. A Pisan and Catalan fleet (some 450 ships), supported by a large army, conquer Ibiza and Mallorca. They destroy the bases on the islands used by Moorish pirates to prey on Mediterranean shipping.
 Battle of Martorell: The Almoravid governor of Zaragoza, Muhàmmad ibn al-Hajj, launches an offensive against the County of Barcelona, but is defeated by Ramon Berenguer III.
 As part of the Norman expansion southward, Count Routrou II enters the service of King Alfonso I (the Battler) of Aragon. 

 Asia 
 Emperor Hui Zong of the Song Dynasty sends a gift of Chinese musical instruments, for use in royal banquets to the Korean court of Goryeo, by request from King Yejong.

 By topic 

 Earthquake 
 November 29 – A large earthquake damages the areas of the Crusaders in the Middle East. From Antioch and Mamistra to Marash and Edessa are hit by the shocks.

 Religion 
 The cathedral of Chichester in England, constructed of wood, is destroyed by fire.
 Pontigny Abbey, a Cistercian monastery, is founded (located in Burgundy).

Births 
 Al-Suhayli, Moorish scholar and writer (d. 1185)
 Bhāskara II, Indian mathematician (d. 1185)
 Dirk VI (or Theodoric), count of Holland (d. 1157)
 Fujiwara no Shunzei, Japanese nobleman (d. 1204)
 Gebhard III, German nobleman (approximate date)
 Gerard of Cremona, Italian translator (d. 1187)
 Henry of Scotland, 3rd Earl of Northumbria (d. 1152)
 Otto I, German bishop and chronicler (d. 1158)
 Ramon Berenguer IV, count of Barcelona (d. 1162)

Deaths 
 February 24 – Thomas II, archbishop of York
 October – Abu Ishaq Ibrahim ibn Ahmad al-Mustazhir, was the son of Abbasid caliph al-Mustazhir and Ismah.
 Abu al-Mu'in al-Nasafi, Arab theologian (or 1115)
 Álvar Fáñez (or Háñez), Castilian nobleman
 Alypius of the Caves, Kievan monk and painter
 Erard I, French nobleman and crusader (b. 1060)
 Nestor the Chronicler, Kievan historian (or 1113)
 Richard of Salerno, Norman nobleman (b. 1060)
 Shahriyar IV, king of Mazandaran (b. 1039)
 Tokushi, Japanese empress consort (b. 1060)

References